Blate is a small settlement southwest of Dolenja Vas in the Municipality of Ribnica in southern Slovenia. The area is part of the traditional region of Lower Carniola and is now included in the Southeast Slovenia Statistical Region.

References

External links
Blate on Geopedia

Populated places in the Municipality of Ribnica